The Dr. Elmo and Rhea Eddington House is a historic house located in Lehi, Utah.

Description and history 
It is a -story period style cottage, built of red brick laid in a common-bond pattern, and rests on a concrete foundation, and it was built around 1932. According to its NRHP nomination, it is "one of only 42 Period Revival buildings" in Lehi. Stylistically, it is a combination of Tudor Revival and Colonial Revival elements of architecture.

It was listed on the National Register of Historic Places on December 4, 1998.

References

Houses completed in 1932
Houses in Utah County, Utah
Houses on the National Register of Historic Places in Utah
Buildings and structures in Lehi, Utah
National Register of Historic Places in Utah County, Utah